Taemin is the self-titled third studio album and debut Japanese studio album by South Korean singer Taemin. The album contains twelve tracks and includes Japanese versions of previously released songs by Taemin. The album was released digitally on November 5, 2018, through EMI Records and Universal Music Japan. The album's physical release occurred on November 28, 2018.

Background and release

On September 22, 2018, the official Shinee Japanese Instagram account posted a highlight medley for the upcoming Taemin album, although at that time the album was reported to be titled Eclipse. It was also announced that the single "Eclipse" would be released on September 26.

On October 3, 2018, Taemin officially announced that he would release his first Japanese studio album on November 28, 2018. The album would feature "Eclipse" as the lead single, which was first revealed during the Sirius tour. A live version music video for the single was subsequently released on YouTube on November 6, 2018. The second single, "Mars", was released on October 14, 2018.

The song "What’s This Feeling" from the album is the theme song for the Japanese drama Final Life: Even If You Disappear Tomorrow, which Taemin starred in. The album also includes two previously released Japanese songs, "Sayonara Hitori" and "Flame of Love". "Sayonara Hitori" was released on Taemin's Sayonara Hitori EP on July 27, 2016, with a music video released earlier on July 5, 2016. Similarly, "Flame of Love" was released on Taemin's Flame of Love EP on July 18, 2017, with a music video released earlier on June 26, 2017. In addition to this, the album contains three Japanese versions of songs that were previously released in Korean by Taemin: "Drip Drop", "Danger", and "Press Your Number".

The music video for Taemin's new song "Under My Skin" was released on November 12, 2018 (November 13 JST). On November 24, 2018, Taemin hosted a release celebration for his album on TV.

The album was released in three versions: a normal version, a first press limited edition, and a fan club limited edition. The first press limited edition includes a DVD with music videos and a shooting sketch video, while the fan club limited edition includes a DVD with front-row recordings of Taemin's performance at the Pacifico Yokohama National Convention Hall during his Sirius tour.

Track listing

Charts

References

2018 albums
Taemin albums
Japanese-language albums